Saoud Abdul Aziz M. Al Mohannadi (1 January 1957 – 10 January 2023), is the vice president of Qatar Football Association and vice president of Asian Football Confederation. He is presently elected as a member in the FIFA Council.

He was elected as a member during the Asia Football Confederation held in Lampur, Malaysia on 6 April 2019 for a sessions of 2019-2023 and was elected with a vote of 37 out of 46, along three member of Asia Football to represent Asia in FIFA council.

Career 
Saoud since joining the AFC and QFA he has been part of the committee organizing the Qatar and  the Australia tournament during the 2011 Qatar tournament and 2015 Australian tournament. He also served as secretary general of Qatar FA from 2001 to 2012 and had held various positions such includes; chairman AFC competition committee and chairman UAE 2019 Organising Committee of the Asian Football Confederation Cup.

Saoud passed away on 10 Jan 2023.

Notes 

Association football executives
Sports executives and administrators
Living people
1957 births